Serena and Venus Williams defeated Lindsay Davenport and Corina Morariu in the final, 6–2, 4–6, 6–4 to win the women's doubles tennis title at the 2001 Australian Open. It was the Williams sisters' fourth major doubles title, and they completed the career Golden Slam in doubles with the win.

Lisa Raymond and Rennae Stubbs were the defending champions, but lost in the first round to Martina Hingis and Monica Seles.

Seeds
Champion seeds are indicated in bold text while text in italics indicates the round in which those seeds were eliminated.

Draw

Finals

Top half

Section 1

Section 2

Bottom half

Section 3

Section 4

External links
 2001 Australian Open – Women's draws and results at the International Tennis Federation

Women's Doubles
Australian Open (tennis) by year – Women's doubles
2001 in Australian women's sport